Paul Anthony Sugrue (born 6 November 1960) is an English former professional footballer who played as a forward in the Football League for Manchester City, Cardiff City, Middlesbrough, Portsmouth, Northampton Town and Newport County.

Sugrue played non-league football for Nuneaton Borough before a long career in the Football League. He then returned to non-league with Bridgend Town and played for Elo Kuopio in Finland, before returning to England to play a pivotal role in Barnet's 1991 Conference title-winning campaign. He had a spell as manager at Nuneaton Borough, and later became vice-chairman of Merthyr Tydfil, taking over managerial duties as well in February 2006.

Personal life 
In late 2017 Sugrue appeared in court on fraud charges, alongside fellow former footballer Mark Aizlewood and others. He was found guilty in February 2018 and sentenced to seven years imprisonment.

References

External links
 Biography at Portsmouth F.C. fansite Pompeyrama

1960 births
Living people
Footballers from Coventry
English footballers
Association football forwards
Nuneaton Borough F.C. players
Manchester City F.C. players
Cardiff City F.C. players
Middlesbrough F.C. players
Portsmouth F.C. players
Northampton Town F.C. players
Newport County A.F.C. players
English Football League players
English football managers
Nuneaton Borough F.C. managers
Merthyr Tydfil F.C. players
Bridgend Town A.F.C. players
English fraudsters
English criminals